Vox humana (Latin, 'human voice') is a reed stop on the pipe organ.

Vox humana may also refer to:
 1974 cantata by Allan Pettersson
 Vox Humana (Alfred Wolfsohn album), 1956
 Vox Humana (Daniel Amos album), 1984
 Vox Humana (Kenny Loggins album), 1985
 "Vox Humana" (song)
 Vox Humana (political party), in Sweden
 "Vox Humana", B-side of the 1991 Orchestral Manoeuvres in the Dark single "Then You Turn Away"

See also
Voice of the people (disambiguation)
Vox populi (disambiguation)
 La voix humaine, an opera